Garth Brooks/Plus ONE is an upcoming concert residency by American country pop singer Garth Brooks at The Colosseum at Caesars Palace in Las Vegas. It is scheduled to begin on May 18, 2023 and will consist of 27 total shows. Brooks will present the performances both in an intimate, one-man show format, and also with his band present on select songs throughout the set.

Background
After the completion of his Stadium Tour in 2022, Brooks announced the concert residency on November 14, 2022 during an appearance on Good Morning America. The title, Plus ONE, is a reference to the intimate format of the performances, however Brooks has stated his band will be present at each show, joining him for certain songs. The Las Vegas residence will be the second in Brooks' career, following his Garth at Wynn performances from 2009 to 2014.

Due to high demand, tickets were sold through Ticketmaster's Verified Fan program. All 2023 shows for the residency sold out within the first day of presale, prompting Brooks to hint at possible 2024 dates to be added. The following week, Brooks announce the extension of the residency into 2024, with those "Verified Fans" from the initial on-sale receiving first access to tickets.

Residency dates

See also
 List of Garth Brooks concert tours

References

External links
Garth Brooks' official website

2023 concert residencies
Garth Brooks concert tours